The flag of the United States Air Force was introduced in 1951 and consists of the U.S. Air Force's crest and shield, which itself comprises 13 white stars and the Department of the Air Force's coat of arms on a field of blue. The 13 stars represent the 13 original British American colonies, the three star grouping at the top portray the three Departments of the Department of Defense (Army, Navy, and Air Force). The crest includes the North American bald eagle (the national bird of the US), the cloud formation depicts the creation of a new firmament, and the wreath, composed of six alternate folds of silver and blue, incorporates the colors of the basic shield design.

History
The flag was officially adopted by President Harry S. Truman on 26 March 1951. Elements of the flag's design are used on the Department of the Air Force seal as well as the U.S. Air Force's service mark. Dorothy G. Gatchell designed the flag itself, whereas the crest and shield that are featured on it were designed by Arthur E. Dubois. The flag's design has remained unchanged since its introduction in 1951.

Design
There are two differently-sized variants of the flag that are used officially. A large one with an aspect ratio of 33:26, which also serves as the flag of the U.S. Air Force's headquarters element, and a smaller-sized variant with an aspect ratio of 4:3. The larger variant, known officially as the "Ceremonial Departmental Flag" and also referred to as being "Ceremonial"-sized, can be adorned with a 2-inch-wide fringe and campaign streamers, whereas the smaller variant may not be adorned with campaign streamers.

The flag itself consists of the "crest and shield" of the U.S. Air Force, defacing a field of blue. The exact shade of blue that is used for the field is Ultramarine Blue on the Pantone Matching System color scale.

Streamers 
Verified combat credit entitles an organization to the appropriate campaign streamers representing the named campaign in which it participated. The campaign streamer will be embroidered with the name and years of the campaign. Non-combat service is represented by an organizational service streamer, which is not embroidered.

Mexican Revolution

World War I

World War II

American Theater

European African Middle Eastern Theater

Asiatic-Pacific Theater

Korean War

Vietnam War

Persian Gulf War and Iraqi no-fly zones

Kosovo War

Global War on Terrorism

See also
 Flags of the United States Armed Forces

Notes

References

Further reading
A Guide to United States Air Force Lineage and Honors, United States: Air Force Historical Research Agency
 A.T. Warnock, Combat Medals, Streamers, and Campaigns

Air Force
Air force flags
United States Air Force
Flags displaying animals